Gertrude's Puzzles is a 1984 edutainment video game for the Apple II, Commodore 64, and IBM PC compatibles by The Learning Company. It is considered a sequel to the game Gertrude's Secrets. Gertrude's Puzzles was designed by Teri Perl. Gertrude's Puzzles, like Gertrude's Secrets, consists of a series of rooms, each of which contains a logic or categorization puzzle to solve using shapes and colors.

See also 
 Rocky's Boots
 Robot Odyssey

References

External links 
 Gertrude's Puzzles at MyAbandonware
 

1982 video games
Apple II games
Commodore 64 games
DOS games
Children's educational video games
The Learning Company games
Video games developed in the United States
Video game sequels